Nuria Montero (born 8 October 1978) is a Spanish former professional tennis player.

Montero reached a career-best singles ranking of 297 and made her only WTA Tour main-draw appearance as a qualifier at the 1998 Madrid Open. She was beaten in the first round by María Sánchez Lorenzo, after securing qualifying wins over Conchita Martínez Granados, Syna Schmidle and Alicia Ortuño, the latter in a walkover.

As a doubles player, Montero had a career-high ranking of 193, and won eleven titles on the ITF Circuit.

ITF Circuit finals

Singles: 3 (1 title, 2 runner-ups)

Doubles: 14 (11 titles, 3 runner-ups)

References

External links
 
 

1978 births
Living people
Spanish female tennis players
20th-century Spanish women